A Father's Choice is a 2000 American made-for-television drama film starring Peter Strauss, Mary McDonnell, Michelle Trachtenberg, Yvonne Zima and Susan Hogan. It was directed by Christopher Cain and written by Richard Leder.

Plot
Two sisters accustomed with the fast-paced life in the big city are forced to live with their father in the country when their mother is killed.

Cast
 Peter Strauss as Charlie 'Mac' McClain
 Mary McDonnell as Susan Shaw
 Michelle Trachtenberg as Kelly McClain
 Yvonne Zima as Chris McClain
 Susan Hogan as Gayle Miller

Production
A Father's Choice was based on a true story and was mostly filmed at the cities of Airdrie and Calgary, Alberta, Canada.

Reception
A Father's Choice gathered some good reviews from critics. The Movie Scene gave the movie a good review, stating: "Director Christopher Cain not only does a nice job of framing some beautiful scenes but he also keeps the drama moving and evolving at a pleasant pace. Plus the acting is alright with Peter Strauss certainly looking at home as a cowboy whilst Mary McDonnell has this soft radiance and warmth going on which makes those romantic moments charming. Then there is a young Yvonne Zima and Michelle Trachtenberg as Chris and Kelly with Trachtenberg bring attitude to the role as the daughter who resents her father and living in his tiny shack on a ranch".

References

External links
 
 
 The Movie Scene

2000 television films
2000 films
2000 drama films
2000s English-language films
CBS network films
Films directed by Christopher Cain
Films shot in Calgary
American drama television films
2000s American films